is a Japanese footballer currently playing as a midfielder for Júbilo Iwata.

Career statistics

Club
.

Notes

References

External links

2003 births
Living people
Association football people from Shizuoka Prefecture
Japanese footballers
Association football midfielders
Júbilo Iwata players